Stephen Wilcox, Jr. (February 12, 1830 – November 27, 1893) was an American inventor, best known as the co-inventor (with George Herman Babcock) of the water-tube boiler. They went on to found the Babcock & Wilcox Company. He was born in Westerly, Rhode Island. and died in November 1893 at age 63 in Rhode Island

References
 Biography at National Inventors Hall of Fame

1830 births
1893 deaths
19th-century American inventors
People of the Industrial Revolution